Ramon Lopes de Freitas (born August 7, 1989) is a Brazilian footballer. Lopes plays mainly as a striker or left midfielder for Khor Fakkan.

Club career
Ramon Lopes started his professional career in the team of Fluminense followed by a 1-year period of playing in Cruzeiro. In early 2009 Ramon Lopes was transferred to Ukrainian side Volyn Lutsk where he played in 78 games for 4,5 years, scoring 8 goals.

In the summer of 2013, his contract expired and on 7 June 2013 Lopes was presented as a new player of Bulgarian side Levski Sofia. He signed with the Bulgarians until 2015, but in August 2013 he again signed a contract, as a free agent, with FC Volyn.
In June 2014, his transfer to Vegalta Sendai of J League was announced.

On 29 July 2021, Lopes joined Al-Fayha. On 19 May 2022, he scored the equalizer for Al-Fayha against Al Hilal in the 2022 King Cup Final, which his club eventually won by 3–1 on penalties.

On 15 September 2022, Lopes joined Khor Fakkan.

Club statistics
Updated to 18 February 2019.

Honours
Al-Fayha
King Cup: 2021–22

References

External links

Profile at Kashiwa Reysol
Profile at LevskiSofia.info

1989 births
Living people
Brazilian footballers
Brazilian expatriate footballers
Expatriate footballers in Ukraine
Expatriate footballers in Bulgaria
Expatriate footballers in Japan
Expatriate footballers in the United Arab Emirates
Expatriate footballers in Saudi Arabia
Cruzeiro Esporte Clube players
Fluminense FC players
FC Volyn Lutsk players
PFC Levski Sofia players
Vegalta Sendai players
Kashiwa Reysol players
Khor Fakkan Sports Club players
Al-Fayha FC players
Ukrainian Premier League players
First Professional Football League (Bulgaria) players
J1 League players
UAE Pro League players
Saudi Professional League players
Brazilian expatriate sportspeople in Ukraine
Brazilian expatriate sportspeople in Bulgaria
Brazilian expatriate sportspeople in Japan
Brazilian expatriate sportspeople in the United Arab Emirates
Brazilian expatriate sportspeople in Saudi Arabia
Association football forwards
Footballers from Belo Horizonte